Martin Ashby (born 5 February 1944) is a retired English international speedway rider who reached the final of the
Speedway World Championship in 1968. He also finished third in the Speedway World Pairs Championship  in 1969 with Nigel Boocock and was a member of the Great Britain team that won the World Team Cups in 1968 and 1975. His brother David Ashby was a teammate for several years at Swindon

Career
Ashby began his career with the Swindon Robins in 1961 but was moved on to the Exeter Falcons in 1968 by the speedway rider control committee. Three years later he returned to Swindon, and remained there for the rest of his career, apart from a short spell at Reading Racers in 1980 where he helped secure the title. Ashby was a regular England international. Ashby held the club record for most appearances (641) and points total (5,4765½) until 2008 when Leigh Adams overtook the points record.

British Finalist (1967, 1968, 1969, 1970, 1971, 1972, 1973, 1974, 1975, 1977) 
World Team Cup Champion (1968, 1975)
49 England Caps
21 GB Caps

Last rode end of season 1980 at Reading.
Since retiring, has been running a motorcycle workshop: repairs, and tuning etc.

World Final Appearances

Individual World Championship
 1968 -  Göteborg, Ullevi - 11th - 5pts
 1975 -  London, Wembley Stadium - Reserve - did not ride

World Pairs Championship
 1969* -  Stockholm, Gubbängens IP (with Nigel Boocock) - 3rd - 21pts (10)
* Unofficial World Championships.

World Team Cup
 1968* -  London, Wembley Stadium (with Ivan Mauger / Nigel Boocock / Barry Briggs / Norman Hunter) - Winner - 40pts (8)
 1969* -  Rybnik, Rybnik Municipal Stadium (with Nigel Boocock / Ivan Mauger / Barry Briggs) - 2nd - 27pts (5)
 1975 –  Norden, Motodrom Halbemond (with Malcolm Simmons / Peter Collins / John Louis) – Winner – 41pts (10)

* 1968 and 1969 for Great Britain. All others for England.

References

1944 births
Living people
British speedway riders
English motorcycle racers
Exeter Falcons riders
Swindon Robins riders
Reading Racers riders
People from Marlborough, Wiltshire